The Liapootah Power Station is a run-of-the-river hydroelectric power station located in the Central Highlands region of Tasmania, Australia. The power station is situated on the Lower River Derwent catchment and is owned and operated by Hydro Tasmania.

Technical details
Part of the Derwent scheme that comprises eleven hydroelectric power stations, the Liapootah Power Station is the first power station in the lower run-of-river system. The power station is located aboveground below Lake Liapootah. Water from the Derwent below the Tarraleah and Tungatinah Power Station is diverted through a  concrete lined tunnel. Lake
Liapootah is very narrow and is considered a run of river storage. During high inflow events the pond level can threaten the Tarraleah Power Station upstream. The drum gate is designed to lower automatically and maintain a maximum pond level below the flood level of Tarraleah station. Having the drum gate installed maximises the head at Liapootah station. The alternative to this would have been to build the dam at a lower level, thus reducing the available output from Liapootah station.

Within the station building, each turbine has a fully embedded spiral casing and water flow is controlled by a spherical rotary main inlet valve and a turbine relief valve designed to prevent spiral casing overpressure. The station output, estimated to be  annually, is fed to TasNetworks' transmission grid via three banks of 11 kV/220 kV three-phase English Electric generator transformers to the outdoor switchyard.

See also 

List of power stations in Tasmania

References

External links
Hydro Tasmania page on the Lower Derwent

Energy infrastructure completed in 1960
Hydroelectric power stations in Tasmania
Central Highlands (Tasmania)
Run-of-the-river power stations